Cyrille Bonnand (born 5 August 1970) is a French former professional cyclo-cross cyclist and cross-country mountain biker. He notably finished third at the European Cross-country Championships in 1995 and won the French national cross-country championships in 1997. In 2009, he was suspended for 4 years for testing positive for EPO, which ended his career.

Major results

Cyclo-cross

1991–1992
 UCI World Cup
1st Hoogerheide
1993–1994
 6th UCI World Championships
2000–2001
 2nd National Championships
2008–2009
 1st Cyclocross International de Lanarvily

Mountain bike
1996
 3rd  European XCO Championships
1997
 1st  National XCO Championships

References

External links

Living people
French mountain bikers
1970 births
French male cyclists
Sportspeople from Albi
Cyclo-cross cyclists
Cyclists from Occitania (administrative region)